= Honsocker Knob =

Summit in West Virginia, United States

Coordinates: 39°42′04″N 80°24′22″W

Honsocker Knob is a summit in West Virginia, in the United States. With an elevation of 1,617 feet (493 m), Honsocker Knob is the 723rd highest summit in the state of West Virginia.

Honsocker Knob most likely derives its name from the local Handsucker family.
